Microwave volumetric heating (MVH) is a method of using microwaves to evenly heat the entire volume of a flowing liquid, suspension or semi-solid. The process is known as MVH because the microwaves penetrate uniformly throughout the volume of the product being heated, thus delivering energy evenly into the body of the material. 

This is in contrast to traditional thermal processing, which relies on conduction and convection from hot surfaces to deliver energy into the product. Liquids, suspensions, or semi-solids heated by MVH do not come into contact with hot surfaces; this minimizes thermal damage to functional components, and allows thick and viscous products to be heated without fouling. 

Processing temperatures can be very accurately controlled by varying the flow rate of the product through the MVH treatment chamber. The slower the flow, the higher the final product temperature. Flowing liquids move continuously through a unique treatment chamber, thereby heating the product.

Thermal processing using microwaves
The FDA accepts that microwaves can be used to heat food for commercial use, pasteurization and sterilization. The main mechanism of microbial inactivation by microwaves is due to thermal effect; the phenomenon of lethality due to 'non-thermal effect' is controversial, and the mechanisms suggested include selective heating of micro-organisms, electroporation, cell membrane rupture, and cell lysis due to electromagnetic energy coupling. 

Because microwaves transfer electromagnetic energy at a molecular level, and the vibration of the molecules creates heat through friction, it is difficult to properly check for this highly localized 'micro'-thermal effect or create conditions where study of the putative 'athermal' effect is possible.

Processes

 Pasteurization
 Flash pasteurization
 Food preservation
 Microwave chemistry
 Dielectric heating

References
   

Microwave technology